KCTY may refer to:

 KCTY (AM), a radio station (1590 AM) licensed to serve Wayne, Nebraska, United States
 KTCH, a radio station (104.9 FM) licensed to serve Emerson, Nebraska, which held the call sign KCTY from 2007 to 2014
 KOPW, a radio station (106.9 FM) licensed to serve Plattsmouth, Nebraska, which held the call sign KCTY-FM from 1999 to 2007
 KCTY (defunct), a defunct television station (channel 25) formerly serving Kansas City, Missouri, United States
 The ICAO code for Cross City Airport in Cross City, Florida